"May There Always Be Sunshine" ( or ) is a popular Soviet children's song created in 1962. The music was composed by Arkady Ostrovsky and the lyrics written by Lev Oshanin. Korney Chukovsky, a writer and immensely popular children's poet, later wrote that the inspiration for the song had been the four lines of the refrain, which were composed in 1928 by the four-year-old boy Kostya Barannikov.

The song was first performed in the Good Morning! radio show in July 1962 by Maya Kristalinskaya. Performed in 1963 at the Sopot International Song Festival by Tamara Miansarova, the song earned her first prize there and immediately became popular throughout the USSR and in other countries too. It was frequently sung by Young Pioneers at their camps and school meetings, as well as by Little Octobrists in primary schools, and even by pre-school children. The song was widely regarded in the Soviet Union as expressing the people's desire for peace.

Lyrics 
The song expresses the yearning for lasting peace by millions of people, young and old. In war, the lyrics say, there are no winners. For our sake, and especially for our children's sake, we must achieve peace and remove the dark clouds that now cover the sun.

International versions 
The song was translated into English by Tom Botting. The song (or at least its chorus) has been sung in English by Pete Seeger, and is featured on the live album Together in Concert recorded in 1975 with Arlo Guthrie.

The song was translated into German by Ilse and Hans Naumilkat and Manfred Streubel (as "Immer lebe die Sonne") and was popular among Ernst Thälmann Pioneers.

The song was also very popular among Finnish Pioneers as "Paistaa aurinko aina".

It was also used by the Estonian Pioneers, the Estonian translation being "Olgu jääv meile päike" by Heljo Mänd. The most popular recording of it, is by the popular singer Georg Ots.

Hebrew lyrics were written for the song by composer Gidi Koren. It was recorded (Hebrew title: אלוהים שמור על אמא) and made popular by his Israeli folk group, The Brothers and the Sisters.

In popular culture 
The tune was used in the song "Gabrielle" by the Hootenanny Singers, led by Björn Ulvaeus. When this version became a hit in 1964, the lyrics were translated and performed by the group in Swedish, German, Finnish, Italian, Dutch, and English.

Charlotte Diamond, the Canadian children's musician included the song in her 1985 album 10 Carrot Diamond. The chorus is sung in English, Russian, French, Spanish, German, and Cantonese with the instrumental accompaniment changing musical styles for each culture.

Raffi sang the original chorus and translations into English, Spanish and French on his album Let's Play. There is also an instrumental outro of the other song's title after this song.

This song was included in a medley during the opening ceremonies of the 2014 Olympic Winter Games in Sochi, Russia.

See also
 List of anti-war songs

References

External links 
 
 
 
 Eintrag im Songlexikon 

Russian children's songs
1962 songs
1962 in the Soviet Union
Vladimir Lenin All-Union Pioneer Organization
Pioneer movement
Soviet songs
Anti-war songs